Hamilton County is the name of ten counties in the United States of America, eight of them named for Alexander Hamilton, first United States Secretary of the Treasury:

Hamilton County, Florida
Hamilton County, Illinois
Hamilton County, Indiana
Hamilton County, Iowa (named for William W. Hamilton, president of the Iowa state senate)
Hamilton County, Kansas, the least populous county on the list
Hamilton County, Nebraska
Hamilton County, New York, the most sparsely populated county in the eastern half of the United States
Hamilton County, Ohio, the most populous county on the list
Hamilton County, Tennessee
Hamilton County, Texas (named for James Hamilton Jr., Governor of South Carolina from 1830 to 1832)

See also
Hamilton County Fair (disambiguation)